The Mole Man (Harvey Rupert Elder) is a supervillain appearing in American comic books published by Marvel Comics. The Mole Man is a recurring foe of the Fantastic Four and was the first villain they ever faced. His schemes usually consist of trying to rule the surface of the Earth with the aid of his "Moloids", subterranean, mole-human hybrids that he rules over.

The character has had numerous appearances in other media, usually on television and video games.

Publication history

Created by artist/co-writer Jack Kirby and writer Stan Lee, the character first appeared in The Fantastic Four #1 (Nov. 1961). The character's name was at the time spelled "Moleman" in one word. The spelling "Mole Man" came in The Fantastic Four No. 22 (Jan. 1964).

Fictional character biography
The Mole Man was originally Harvey Rupert Elder, an American nuclear engineer and explorer. Elder was socially shunned due to a combination of his abrasive personality and his homely dwarfish appearance. Furthermore, his fellow explorers ridiculed him for his eccentric, crackpot theories regarding a Hollow Earth. In 1956, while following the group of explorers called the Monster Hunters, he stumbled upon Monster Isle, which was at the time a base of the Deviant Warlord Kro.

When Elder fell into a massive cave leading deep into the underground realm of Subterranea, he decided his theories had finally been vindicated. However, his eyes were permanently damaged when he gazed directly upon a highly reflective deposit of diamonds. Partially blind and apparently secluded from the surface world forever, Elder dubbed himself the Mole Man and began exploring his new home. He eventually became the ruler of the branch of Subterraneans now known as the Moloids, and the ruler of much of Subterranea and the caverns of Monster Isle. He used the Deviant-derived creatures and technology that he found in Subterranea to strike back at the outer world in numerous attempts to rule or humble the world that had rejected him.

The Mole Man conducted attacks on the surface world by destroying nuclear power plants in the Eastern Bloc, Australia, South America, and French Equatorial Africa, attracting the attention of the newly formed Fantastic Four in their first adventure. After the group arrived on Monster Isle, he captured Mister Fantastic and the Human Torch and told them his plans to invade every major urban area on the planet via a network of tunnels. When he released a horde of monsters the Human Torch sealed his realm's entrance. The Mole Man appeared to have destroyed Monster Isle in an atomic blast. The Mole Man's Deviant-bred monstrous mutates, collectively known as the "Mole Man's Monsters", include the three-headed Tricephalous, the horned Megataur, and the flying bird-insect creature known only as "Skreeal". The Mole Man also has a group of superhuman allies called the Outcasts.

The Mole Man later stole buildings from New York City, but was thwarted by the Fantastic Four and appeared to be killed in an explosion. With the Red Ghost, he next battled the Avengers and tried to use a machine that caused earthquakes to take over the world by threatening to destroy all life on Earth, capturing Giant-Man who had been warned by ants of the earthquakes as they sensed them first. Later the Wasp released Giant-Man and he shrunk down to ant-size and sabotaged the machine. Iron Man then sealed the tunnel entrances. The Red Ghost then broke up the partnership. Mole Man was among the criminals later assembled by Doctor Doom's mind-control device to attack Reed and Sue's wedding. Mole Man then fought a war against rival Subterranean ruler Tyrannus, capturing the Fountain of Youth which allowed Tyrannus to stay young. Tyrannus teleported the Hulk underground to help him regain the Fountain. Finally, he was able to restore himself. Mole Man used the original X-Men as pawns in his war against Tyrannus. The Mole Man later trapped the Fantastic Four in a house of his own creation that temporarily blinded them. Mole Man continued to fight his war with Tyrannus.

He later teamed with Kala, the queen of the Subterranean Netherworlders, and fell in love with her. He plotted to destroy the surface world, but was betrayed by Kala and Tyrannus. Some time later, Mole Man and Kala were betrothed to be married. Namor, the Atlantean prince, helped out the Moloids when a conquering force was slaughtering many, while using the rest of them for slave labor.

Much later, Mole Man befriended the Thing and then plotted to raise a new continent at the cost of sinking California, but was again thwarted by the Fantastic Four. He was captured by Lava Men later. Mole Man then attempted to bring peace to Subterranea, but was attacked by Fantastic Four clones. He contended with Skrulls and tried unsuccessfully to capture a Skrull technotroid egg.

Mole Man later allied with Grotesk and Tyrannus against Deviants led by Brutus. He aided the Hulk in fighting Brutus's Deviants. Together with his allies, he triumphed over Brutus, and welcomed back Kala as his consort.

Mole Man became involved with the West Coast Avengers when one of his monsters attacked Los Angeles. His Moloids were caught in the middle of a Skrull revenge scheme on the Fantastic Four. A replacement Fantastic Four, consisting of Spider-Man, Ghost Rider, the Hulk and Wolverine were tricked into entering the Mole Man's territory and battling his forces.

He later battled the West Coast Avengers along with the U-Foes during the Acts of Vengeance, but their attempts met with failure.

Later, he surrendered his desire for conquest and revenge and began assembling a sanctuary for others who had been rejected by the surface world. His two attempts to do so led to the deaths of most of the visitors to his sanctuaries. Briefly, the Mole Man allowed Adam Warlock's superhero team, the Infinity Watch, to use Monster Isle (more specifically, a castle located on its grounds) as a base, on the reasoning that they could help protect him from any meddlers, which they did on several occasions. They proved helpful when the United Nations invaded the island. The Watch, primarily Gamora, drove away the invading force with an absolute minimum of harm. The Avengers assisted with the United Nations, then recognized the Mole Man's rulership over the island.

Mole Man tended to keep out of the way when the cosmic plans went on. The Watch occupied the Monster Isle castle until their dissolution as a team. Following their departure, the Mole Man apparently returned to his solitary, vengeful existence. Aside from occasional fits of hostility, he seems for the most part content to rule his subterranean kingdom, and for the past few years his surface activities have mostly been limited to reacting to threats (real or imagined) to his people.

In one incident, he was causing property damage purely to help the Moloids, whose water and food had become polluted. He appeared in The Mighty Avengers having led an attack on New York, claiming retaliation for his underground home, which he says is destroyed. He was humiliated by a female-formed Ultron, who destroyed his remaining monsters, and he was arrested.

Mole Man was also behind a series of Chupacabra attacks in Puerto Rico. His motive was to protect the blood-drinking race from extinction. He was defeated by the Fantastic Four.

In the "Live Fast" story arc of Runaways, the Runaways are fighting a huge tall sky-scraper sized monster. When Victor suggests Nico shrink it, Nico mentions she already used that spell on Mole Man.

Mole Man witnessed the return of the Hulk, which pleased him. However, when the Hulk was defeated and his stone ship destroyed, various creatures from planet Sakaar were released into the underground. Mole Man trained the alien beasts and led them to attack New York once more. However, the creatures were really waiting for the arrival of Hulk's son Skaar. During this time, Tyrannus rose to challenge Mole Man's claim and used magic to pervert the aliens so that they could destroy the surface. Skaar went into a berserker rage and thus both Tyrannus and Mole Man fled.

Mandarin's White Light Ring approached Mole Man in order to help it and the other rings have revenge on Tony Stark where he became Mandarin-Six. Mole Man and the other Mandarins later travelled to Svartalfheim in order to confront Malekith the Accursed, who had hunted down other three Mandarins and had taken their rings from them. The Mandarins thwarted any attempt of Malekith to hide or flee, as the rings could locate each other. Malekith made a pact with Iron Man (who was also at the time in Svartalfheim to retrieve the rings) disposed of his ring and escaped to safely, as he could no longer be tracked. Following their failure to kill Malekith, the Mandarins resumed their own paths. The Mandarins joined forces once more to help Mole Man's plan to create ring-powered weapons with which destroy cities from their base in Sinister London. A test was thwarted by the Fantastic Four. Before they could release one of the actual machines, Iron Man pinned them down along with the Trojan Guard and Abigail Burns. The Mandarins failed to escape as Iron Man's ally Dark Angel used magic to prevent them from teleporting. After the other Mandarin's are defeated, Mole Man's ring declared him the Prime-Mandarin. Instead, Mole Man abandoned his ring and retreated.

Mole Man was later contacted by unknown individuals to bring them Athol Kussar, the half-brother of mine owner Faust Swart who laundered money to fund HYDRA's African base after he knew about his half-brother's actions and had been previously imprisoned in a mine by Swart while evading the S.H.I.E.L.D. agents. When Mole Man broke into Kussar's cell, Kussar did not want to leave due to a bomb inside his body that would detonate if he left his cell. Mole Man was attacked and knocked down by Invisible Woman who disposed of the bomb and placed Kussar in S.H.I.E.L.D. custody.

As part of the "All-New, All-Different Marvel", Mole Man and his fellow Subterraneans ended up in a civil war with the Subterraneans that are on the side of his son Mole Monster.

When Squirrel Girl's friends Nancy, Tippy Toe and Koi Boi, help set her up an online dating profile, it leads to many unsuccessful dates, one of which ends with an encounter with Mole Man, who is angered by how Doreen's earlier suggestions to Kraven has affected his home. Doreen apologizes to him and the two have a conversation about his situation, leading Mole Man to proposing to Doreen on the spot and a number of follow-up schemes to get Doreen to go on a date with him. He threatens to bury a number of worldwide landmarks if she does not date him, and after Nancy is nearly kidnapped by him and being swarmed by the media, she goes to confront Mole Man only to find that Tricephalous is in love with him. She lets Tricephalous defeat her to woo Mole Man and they leave for good.

Mole Man later appears attacking New York with a group of monsters, but he is defeated by Amadeus Cho's Hulk form, Moon Girl, and Devil Dinosaur.

During the Secret Empire storyline, it is revealed that Mole Man has struck a deal with Captain America to use the tunnels of his subterranean kingdom for his smuggling operation in exchange for specific items from the surface world such as DVDs. When Captain America arrives with the Underground Resistance, Mole Man's kingdom is attacked by Dreadnoughts sent by Hydra. Though the heroes manage to defeat the Dreadnoughts, Mole Man puts an end to his truce with Captain America and lets the heroes leave.

Powers and abilities
The Mole Man has no true superhuman abilities. He is an extraordinary genius, with knowledge of technology centuries beyond conventional science. He was able to master alien principles of technology totally foreign to his culture and environment. Due to his poor eyesight, his senses have naturally compensated to the degree that they are, like those of Daredevil, heightened to nearly superhuman levels.

The Mole Man fights with a staff and has developed a fighting style that resembles bōjutsu; despite his small size and relative weakness he is a highly proficient hand-to-hand combatant when armed with his staff. He also commands an army of monsters and a branch of the Subterraneans known as Moloids that are absolutely loyal to him.

The Mole Man is extremely near-sighted due to damage to his vision from years ago, and his eyes are extremely sensitive to bright light. He is virtually blinded by normal illumination. To counter this, he wears protective glasses (an early version of a nuclear weapons test Range Officer's flash-goggles) that both reduce bright light to levels his weak eyes can tolerate and increase dim light to levels by which he can see. His sense of hearing, smell, and touch are far more sensitive than that of a normal human; these senses are heightened, but not superhuman. He possesses a "radar sense" that supplements his own weak natural vision.

Mole Man has a series of similar-looking staves (6 feet long, made of wood or aluminum), designed by the Mad Thinker, which contain built-in weapons and additional features. Among such weaponry are an electrical blaster, a flame-thrower, a vibro-charge blaster, and a laser cannon. All the staffs appear to have a low-energy radar. All staves are booby-trapped with a galvanic response meter that is tuned solely to the Mole Man's skin conductivity; this prevents anyone else from activating his staves.

Mole Man's life has made him an expert on subterranean geography, spelunking, understanding Deviant weapons systems, and monster training. He has mastered the principles underlying Deviant technology that he discovered in Subterranea and has made radical improvements upon much of it.

Other versions

Exiles
On an earth formerly dominated by Skrulls, Mole Man goes by the name 'Harvey'. When Galactus comes to eat the planet, Harvey is a vital part of the battle by having his monsters undermine the landing spot of their enemy.

Heroes Reborn
The spaceflight which grants the Fantastic Four their powers ends with them crash-landing on Mole Man's monster-inhabited islands. Mole Man ends up capturing Ben and Sue and takes a power source and potential explosive off the group's ship.

This incarnation of the Mole Man looks physically different from his 616 counterpart, with a taller, more muscular build and apparently increased strength, being able to hold up Johnny Storm with only one hand.

Later, there are hints Mole Man's island is connected to the Inhumans' city of Attilian.

Mutant X
In the Mutant X reality, when the Goblin Queen laid siege to New York City, Harvey, alongside his lover Callisto, provided a safe route of evacuation for tens of thousands of humans and mutants out of the city. When Ben Grimm was thrown out of a building by Reed Richards, his excessive bulk led him to the Morlock/Moloid tunnels, where he helped organize the evacuations, and began planning a rebellion.

Season One
In this modern-day re-imagining of the Fantastic Four, the Mole Man is swiftly talked down from his first attack on New York. Reed and Sue hire him and he becomes a valued employee of the Reed business empire. Mole Man later assists in the battle against a rage-maddened Namor by re-powering Ben Grimm and giving him the assistance of a monster.

Spider-Man Newspaper Strip
In the Spider-Man newspaper strip, The Mole Man travels to the surface and attempts to make Mary Jane Parker the queen of his underworld kingdom. When he learns MJ is already married to Peter Parker, these plans are dashed. That same evening, he bumps into May Parker and becomes instantly smitten with her. He eventually decides to kidnap both May and Mary Jane and takes them to his kingdom. Peter chases after them as Spider-Man but is bested in combat by the Mole Man, forcing him to seek out help from The Fantastic Four's Thing. The Mole Man and Aunt May begin to bond romantically, to the point May agrees to marry him. Spider-Man and The Thing arrive and after a short confrontation and conversation, are convinced to honor May's wishes that she spend the rest of her days making a lost soul happy. The wedding, however, is interrupted by May having a physical condition called Spelunker's Lung, which causes her to have severe breathing problems when underground. This condition is what ultimately forces Spider-Man and the Thing to take May back to the surface along with MJ. Mole Man, realizing his newfound love can never rule alongside him due to this condition, reluctantly says goodbye to her and returns home to rule alone.

In this continuity, Mole Man's real name is revealed as "Melvin Kurtzman".

House of M
In the House of M universe created by an insane Scarlet Witch, the Mole Man (under the name Mole-King) appears in Fantastic Four: House of M as an enemy of the Fearsome Four, which is composed of Doctor Doom, Inhuman Torch, Invincible Girl, and It. This version of the Mole Man is killed by the Fearsome Four during a battle with them.

Marvel Zombies
In Marvel Zombies, the Mole Man, along with several other undead villains, first appears to attack Galactus; after Galactus is defeated by several heroes, Mole Man gets into an argument with Colonel America over who gets to eat the injured Galactus, and is subsequently blasted apart by the cosmically powered colonel.

The zombie Mole Man also appears in the prequel to Marvel Zombies, Marvel Zombies: Dead Days, appearing to attack Nova alongside the Wizard.

Ultimate Marvel
In the Ultimate Marvel Universe, Mole Man was a Baxter Building scientist named Dr. Arthur Molekevic. Nicknamed Mole Man by the students, he was fired due to his experiments in creating life after being warned off. He claimed the files as his own but was told by the governmental officials firing him, which included Sue and Johnny's father, Dr. Franklin Storm, that everything he created was the property of the United States government. He soon disappeared into caverns with his Moloids. These caverns contained advanced technology, which Mole Man claimed had been built by an ancient race. Parts of the caverns were also under the Baxter Building itself, which provided Mole Man with links into their security system. His ability to spy on the team fostered his delusion that he was a father figure to them. When the Fantastic Four gained their powers and were transported across the world, Sue, while unconscious, was kidnapped and transported to his caverns. Mole Man sends one of his created monsters to New York to retrieve the others. The other members of the team manage to defeat it. They follow the hole the monster made and confront Mole Man, eventually rescuing Sue. The Four defeat his forces but the Mole Man escapes. However, he returned and kidnapped several Baxter Building students while explaining more details of his life. He was eventually driven off when he left the students behind and went to confront the Fantastic Four, who had arrived to try to rescue them. The students created weaponry from the alien technology and drove off all parties (Mole Man, Fantastic Four and the government), intending to build their own civilization in the ruins of the city.

According to his story, which he told to the abducted Baxter students, Mole Man left his family after he devolved his younger sister into a lungfish and turned his father over to the government for money. His first bioexperiment went unsuccessfully and he sneaked into Europe in the guise of a washerwoman (he adds that he kept the costume and later added sequins to it). He was led to the ruins of the underground civilization by an insane Italian man who was a part of a NATO expedition to find the lost city, the third group to try. The first two groups perished and the rest of the third group either starved to death or killed each other. Though Mole Man found the Italian man's insane antics amusing, he later fed the Italian to an underground monster to gain the monster's trust.

Ultimate Mole Man physically resembles the original character. However, he is bulkier, rarely washes and has an unsightly skin condition. The Ultimate Moloids are fungus-based life-forms engineered by Mole Man himself; though initially simplistic and animalistic, they are more intelligent in their second appearance, even speaking a language which Mole Man understands. Some new Moloids are engineered to have various super-powers.

In other media

Television
 Mole Man appears in the "Iron Man" and the "Namor the Sub-Mariner" segments of The Marvel Super Heroes, voiced by Paul Kligman.
 Mole Man appears in the 1967 Fantastic Four series, voiced by Jack DeLeon.
 Mole Man appears in a self-titled episode of the 1978 Fantastic Four series, voiced by Ted Cassidy.
 Mole Man appears in a self-titled episode of the 1994 Fantastic Four series, voiced by Gregg Berger.
 Mole Man appears in Fantastic Four: World's Greatest Heroes, voiced by Paul Dobson.
 Mole Man appears in The Super Hero Squad Show, voiced by Ted Biaselli. This version is a member of Doctor Doom's Lethal Legion who suffers from intestinal gas problems while above ground. In his most notable appearance, "And Lo? A Pilot Shall Come!", Mole Man obtains an Infinity Fractal and gains super-speed and mind control capabilities as well as aspirations of taking over the Legion, but is defeated and depowered by the Super Hero Squad.
 Mole Man appears in the Hulk and the Agents of S.M.A.S.H. episode "Of Moles and Men", voiced by David Harvard Lawrence. This version moved to Subterranea after being ridiculed for his Hollow Earth theories.

Film
 Ian Trigger was originally meant to play Mole Man in the unreleased film The Fantastic Four, but his character's name was changed to The Jeweler due to co-executive producer Bernd Eichinger not having the rights to the character. In the documentary Doomed!: The Untold Story of Roger Corman's The Fantastic Four, director Oley Sassone confirms the production team used Mole Man in the film's original drafts.
 Dr. Harvey Allen appears in Fantastic Four, portrayed by Tim Blake Nelson. This version is a scientist and supervisor of the Baxter Foundation who oversaw Dr. Franklin Storm's experiments into interdimensional travel despite having initial doubts. Dr. Allen is later murdered by Victor von Doom following his return from Planet Zero. Prior to the reshoots, the character was supposed to be Harvey Elder who would go on to become Mole Man.

Video games
 Mole Man appears in Fantastic Four, voiced by Barry Dennen.
 Mole Man appears in Marvel Super Hero Squad, voiced by Ted Biaselli.
 Mole Man appears in Marvel Super Hero Squad Online, voiced again by Ted Biaselli.
 Mole Man appears as a boss in Marvel Heroes, voiced by Roger Rose.
 Mole Man appears in Pinball FX 2 as part of the Fantastic Four table.

Comic strips
 Mole Man appears in the syndicated comic strip, Scary Gary.
 Mole Man appears in the daily Spider-Man cartoon, in which he dates Spider-Man's Aunt May.

References

External links
 Mole Man at Marvel.com

Comics characters introduced in 1961
Characters created by Jack Kirby
Characters created by Stan Lee
Fictional blind characters
Fictional bojutsuka
Fictional characters with slowed ageing
Fictional characters with superhuman senses
Fictional engineers
Fictional explorers
Fictional kings
Marvel Comics martial artists
Marvel Comics scientists
Marvel Comics supervillains